Eteri Lamoris (born 23 May 1971) is an operatic soprano and voice teacher. Of Georgian descent and now a Spanish citizen, she initially studied with her mother Lamara Chkonia in Tbilisi and later in Madrid. Lamoris made her operatic debut as Desdemona in Otello at the Tbilisi Opera and Ballet Theatre where she later sang roles including Violetta in La traviata and Gilda in Rigoletto. She made her international debut as Musetta in Franco Zeffirelli's production of La bohème at La Scala and went on to perform leading roles in both European and North American opera houses.

Eteri Lamoris teaches voice at the Academy of Belcanto in Graz (Austria). In 2012 she received the Stockholm Culture Foundation's award for Cultural Personality of the Year. The event was at the "Royal Palace". Princess of Sweden Christina Magnuson presented her gold medal with title the “Greatest Singer of Our Time" https://studylibsv.com/doc/466451/as-word-file  video reference directly from Royal Palace https://www.youtube.com/watch?v=KRlXcIOe7kg

References

Further sources
Omelchenko, Tatiana  (3 December 2012). ""Смотреть на несчастья, закусывая камамбером, — ненормально", — убеждена оперная певица Этери Ламорис" (interview). Бизнес. Retrieved 6 November 2014 .
Katashinskaya, Alain (23 May 2014). "Этери Ламорис: покорившая мир". Komsomolskaya Pravda. Retrieved 6 November 2014 .
Dudko, Elena (13 April 2012). "Этери ЛАМОРИС: «На западе очень любят Чайковского, хотя много постановок и Мусоргского»". ATI–Times. Retrieved 6 November 2014 .

External links

"Christmas in Vienna - Die schönsten Momente", orf.at 
Eteri Lamoris, peoples.ru 
Christmas in Vienna mit Garanca, Lamoris, Cura. oe24.at, 2008
"Nicoli und Lamoris: Große Stimmen für Europa", ots.at, 2007 

Spanish operatic sopranos
1971 births
Living people
21st-century Spanish singers
21st-century Spanish women singers